KRCW (96.3 FM, La Maquina) is an American radio station licensed to serve the community of Royal City, Washington, since 1999. The station is owned by Bustos Media, through licensee Bustos Media Holdings, LLC.

Programming
KRCW broadcasts a Regional Mexican music format branded as "La Maquina".

History
In March 1992, the Northwest Communities Educational Center applied to the Federal Communications Commission (FCC) for a construction permit for a new broadcast radio station. The FCC granted this permit on October 15, 1992, with a scheduled expiration date of April 15, 1994. The new station was assigned call sign KQVN on December 3, 1992. The station was assigned new call sign KRCW on May 6, 1994.

In November 1997, the Northwest Communities Educational Center reached an agreement to transfer the permit for KRCW to Farmworker Educational Radio Network, Inc. The FCC approved the deal on December 17, 1997, and the transaction was consummated on March 30, 1998. After a series of delays and extensions, construction and testing were completed in September 1999, the station was granted its broadcast license on December 9, 1999.

Effective October 8, 2019, the Cesar Chavez Foundation (parent of licensee Farmworker Educational Radio Network, Inc.) sold KRCW to Bustos Media for $200,000.

Previous logo

References

External links

RCW
RCW
Regional Mexican radio stations in the United States
Radio stations established in 1999
Grant County, Washington
1999 establishments in Washington (state)